Coast of Bays—Central—Notre Dame is a federal electoral district in Newfoundland and Labrador. It was created from the portions of the island of Newfoundland previously included in the electoral districts of Bonavista—Gander—Grand Falls—Windsor (72%), Humber—St. Barbe—Baie Verte (18%) and Random—Burin—St. George's (10%).

Coast of Bays—Central—Notre Dame was created by the 2012 federal electoral boundaries redistribution and was legally defined in the 2013 representation order. It came into effect upon the call of the 42nd Canadian federal election, scheduled for October 2015.

Under the proposed 2022 Canadian federal electoral redistribution, this riding would be renamed Central Newfoundland.

Demographics 
According to the Canada 2021 Census

Ethnic groups: 91.8% White, 7% Indigenous
Languages: 98.9% English
Religions: 86.3% Christian (19% Catholic, 17.5% Pentecostal and other Charismatic, 17% Anglican, 14.6% Methodist and Wesleyan, 12.6% United Church), 13.2% No religion
Median income: $32,400 (2020) 
Average income: $41,520 (2020)

History
The riding of Coast of Bays—Central—Notre Dame was created in 2013 from the electoral districts of Random—Burin—St. George's, Bonavista—Gander—Grand Falls—Windsor and Avalon. It was the first election result called for in the 2015 and 2019 Canadian federal election.

Election results

2021 general election

2019 general election

2015 general election

Student Vote Results

2019

2015

References

Newfoundland and Labrador federal electoral districts
Gander, Newfoundland and Labrador
Grand Falls-Windsor